This article contains a list of heritage lists and registers in Australia.

National
 Commonwealth Heritage List - register of historically significant places under the control of the Australian government
 Australian National Heritage List -  register national heritage places deemed to be of outstanding heritage significance to Australia
 Australian National Shipwreck Database - a register of over 7000 wrecks located within Australian waters
 List of National Trust properties in Australia - properties owned by National Trust of Australia which are listed on at least one of the National, State or Local Government registers
 List of Overseas Places of Historic Significance to Australia

Former registers
 Register of the National Estate - replaced in 2007 by Commonwealth and Australian National Heritage lists

Australian Capital Territory
 List of buildings and structures in the Australian Capital Territory

New South Wales
New South Wales State Heritage Register

Northern Territory 
 Northern Territory Heritage Register

Queensland
 Queensland Heritage Register
 List of heritage-listed buildings in Rockhampton

Regional
 Brisbane Heritage Register

South Australia
South Australian Heritage Register

Regional
 List of heritage-listed buildings in Burra
 List of state heritage places in the District Council of Grant

Tasmania
 Tasmanian Heritage Register

Victoria
Victorian Heritage Register
Victorian Aboriginal Heritage Register

Melbourne metropolitan area
 List of heritage-listed buildings in Melbourne

Western Australia

Perth metropolitan area
 List of heritage buildings in Perth
 List of heritage places in Fremantle

Wheatbelt region
 List of heritage places in the Shire of Toodyay
 List of heritage places in York, Western Australia

Southwest region
 List of heritage places in Busselton

Peel region
 List of heritage places in the Shire of Waroona

Great Southern region
 List of places on the State Register of Heritage Places in the City of Albany

References

Heritage lists
 
Heritage
Lists of lists